Bahrain Online is a popular online forum and pro-democracy news website founded in 1999 by the Bahraini blogger Ali Abdulemam.

See also 
 Wael Abbas

References

External links 
 

1999 establishments in Bahrain
Internet properties established in 1999
Bahraini democracy movements
Internet forums
Bahraini news websites